is a city located in western Shizuoka Prefecture, Japan. ,  the city had an estimated population of 45,813 in 16980 households  and a population density of 410 persons per km².

Geography
Makinohara is located in south-central Shizuoka Prefecture. It is bordered by Suruga Bay on the Pacific Ocean to the east, and rises gradually to the Makinohara Plateau in the west. The area has a temperate maritime climate, characterized by hot, humid summers and mild winters, with the warm Kuroshio Current off shore providing a moderating effect.

Surrounding municipalities
Shizuoka Prefecture
Omaezaki
Kikugawa
Shimada
Yoshida, Haibara District

Demographics
Per Japanese census data, the population of Makinohara has been relatively steady over the past 50 years.

Climate
The city has a climate characterized by hot and humid summers, and relatively mild winters (Köppen climate classification Cfa).

History
The area of present-day Makinohara was part of former Tōtōmi Province. During the Edo period, the town of Sagara was the castle town of Sagara Domain. With the establishment of the modern municipalities system in the early Meiji period on April 1, 1889, Sagara was incorporated as a town within Haibara District.

The city of Makinohara was established on October 11, 2005, from the merger of the towns of Haibara and Sagara (both from Haibara District).

Government
Makinohara has a mayor-council form of government with a directly elected mayor and a unicameral city legislature of 16 members. The city contributes one member to the Shizuoka Prefectural Assembly.

Economy
The local economy of Makinohara is dominated by the production of green tea, and to a lesser extent by commercial fishing, and manufacturing of automobile components for Suzuki Motors (Sagara Plant).

Fuji Dream Airlines has its headquarters in Makinohara.

Education
Makinohara has seven public elementary schools operated by the city government and one shared between Makinohara and Kikugawa, and three shared between Makinohara and Omaezaki. The city likewise operates two public junior high schools and shares operated with one junior high school with Kikugawa and one with Omaezaki. The city has two public high schools operated by the Shizuoka Prefectural Board of Education.

Transportation

Railway
Although both the Tokaido Shinkansen and the Tokaido Main Line pass through Makinohara, the city has no passenger railway services. The nearest train station is Kikugawa Station in neighboring Kikugawa or Kanaya Station in neighboring Shimada.

Highway
  Tōmei Expressway - Makinohara Interchange

Airport
Shizuoka Airport, which opened in 2009, straddles the border between Makinohara and Shimada.

Local attractions
Sagara Oil field, Japan's only oil field on the Pacific coast. Hand-pumping began in 1873, and the following year, Nippon Oil opened the first mechanical pumping operation in the country at Sagara. Operations ceased in 1955, and in 1980 the field was made into the "Yuden no Sato" Park, operated by the Shizuoka Prefectural government.
Sagara Castle ruins

Sister city relations
 - Kelso, Washington, USA
 - Matsukawa, Nagano (Shimoina), Japan
 - Sannohe, Aomori, Japan
 - Hitoyoshi, Kumamoto, Japan

Notable people from Makinohara
Umetaro Suzuki, scientist, pioneer in vitamin research
Takuma Edamura, professional soccer player

References

External links

 

Cities in Shizuoka Prefecture
Populated coastal places in Japan
Makinohara, Shizuoka